Hal Blumenfeld (born March 28, 1962) is a Professor of Neurology, Neuroscience, and Neurosurgery at Yale University. He is an expert on brain mechanisms of consciousness and on altered consciousness in epilepsy. As director of the Yale Clinical Neuroscience Imaging Center (CNIC) he leads multi-disciplinary research and is also well known for his teaching contributions in neuroanatomy and clinical neuroscience.

Biography

Blumenfeld was born in California, grew up in New York and began his career in Bioelectrical Engineering at Harvard University (1984). His passion for science would lead him to Columbia University where, working with Eric Kandel and Steven Siegelbaum, he obtained his PhD (1990) in Physiology and Cellular Biophysics and his MD (1992). He completed his internal medicine internship at Columbia Presbyterian Medical Center(1993) and entered the field of neurology completing a three-year residency program at Massachusetts General Hospital in Boston (1996). He then completed his fellowship in Epilepsy working with Susan and Dennis Spencer and with David McCormick at Yale University's School of Medicine.

The main goal of Blumenfeld's career has been to understand the processes of diminished consciousness in seizures, enable recovery of mental function during and after seizures, and to advance treatments thereby improving the lives of people living with epilepsy. His laboratory explores the brain when consciousness is impaired by epileptic seizures using advanced brain imaging methods, electrical measurements and testing of behavior. By understanding the processes of awareness, attention and arousal Blumenfeld hopes to restore normal consciousness to patients with epilepsy and other brain disorders.

Scientific contributions
Professor Blumenfeld has studied brain networks in different kinds of seizures as well as normal brain function.  Using multiple modalities of brain imaging in humans and animal models, his research has made contributions towards determining why children with absence seizures become unconscious.

Temporal lobe seizures are the most common form of localized epilepsy. Blumenfeld proposed the “Network Inhibition Hypothesis” which posits that temporal lobe seizures disrupt awareness, attention, and information processing because of depressed arousal function in the brain. In support of this theory, his research team has found sleep-like changes in the brain during these types of seizures. Using state-of-the-art technology, they are able to reveal the processes of these changes, and to test new treatment approaches including deep brain stimulation to restore normal consciousness.

One crucial goal is the prevention of epilepsy before it begins. Blumenfeld found important evidence that early and effective medical treatment of both animal models and human patients with absence epilepsy improves long-term outcome. This is a major shift from current treatment strategies which view seizure medications as suppressing the symptoms, not the underlying disease.

Through active collaborations with Fahmeed Hyder (also at Yale) Blumenfeld's direct recordings of the electrical activity of brain cells improves the analysis of indirect neuroimaging measurements of brain functions by fMRI.

Dr. Blumenfeld and his team have been able to determine that so called generalized tonic-clonic seizures are in fact localized to specific bilateral cortical-subcortical networks. These findings may help produce targeted therapies with better effectiveness and fewer side effects.

Other important innovations in Blumenfeld's work include using virtual-reality driving simulation during video/EEG monitoring to evaluate driving safety in patients with epilepsy. In addition, his research group developed a prospective bedside testing battery, the Responsiveness in Epilepsy Scale (RES). These testing methods provide better information to patients and physicians making decisions about driving, and may help identify brain areas crucial for impaired awareness in epilepsy.

Dr. Blumenfeld has also developed two new approaches to target epilepsy surgery to the correct location in the brain:  1.  3D color movies of the brainwave (EEG) show where the seizures start, making safe and effective surgery much more feasible.  2. Innovative analysis methods with SPECT blood flow imaging that can pinpoint the region for surgical planning.

Using powerful brain imaging methods and electrical recordings Blumenfeld recently found that normal conscious perception of visual stimuli is accompanied by a cascade of activity moving through the brain in less than one second.  These pictures provide a new view of how the brain normally processes information to create a conscious experience.

Teaching contributions
As author of the widely acclaimed textbook Neuroanatomy through Clinical Cases (Sinauer Assoc, Inc) Blumenfeld has inspired many students to study the brain's structure and function and to enter the fields of neurosciences, neurology, neurosurgery and related disciplines.  The textbook is used in over half the medical schools in the United States and throughout the world.

Awards

 American Academy of Neurology, Dreifuss-Penry Epilepsy Research Award (2005).
 Francis Gilman Blake Award. Awarded annually to that member of the faculty of the Yale School of Medicine designated by the senior class as the most outstanding teacher of the medical sciences (2007)
 Visiting Professor, Xiangya School of Medicine, Changsha, Hunan, China (2015-2020)
 Yale Graduate Mentor Award.  For the most outstanding mentor of graduate students in the sciences at Yale University (2015)
 Mark Loughridge and Michele Williams Professorship, Yale University School of Medicine (2015 - )
 National Institute of Neurological Disorders and Stroke, Javits Neuroscience Investigator Award (2017)
 Research Recognition Award, Clinical Science, American Epilepsy Society (2017)

Publications

Books 
Blumenfeld, H. (2021). Neuroanatomy through Clinical Cases, 3rd Ed. Sinauer Associates/Oxford University Press.
Cavanna, A.E., Nani, A., Blumenfeld, H., Laureys, S. [Eds.] (2013). Neuroimaging of Consciousness. Springer.
Faingold, C.,  Blumenfeld, H. [Eds.] (2014). Neuronal Networks in Brain Function, CNS Disorders, and Therapeutics. Elsevier .

Articles
X Herman W, Smith RE, Kronemer SI, Watsky RE, Chen WC, M Gober L, Touloumes GJ, Khosla M, Raja A, Horien CL, C Morse E, L Botta K, Hirsch LJ, Alkawadri R, Gerrard JL, Spencer DD, Blumenfeld H:A Switch and Wave of Neuronal Activity in the Cerebral Cortex During the First Second of Conscious Perception. Cereb Cortex. 2017 Nov. 
Guo JN, Kim R, Chen Y, Negishi M, Jhun S, Weiss S, Ryu JH, Bai X, Xiao W, Feeney E, Rodriguez-Fernandez J, Mistry H, Crunelli V, Crowley MJ, Mayes LC, Constable RT, Blumenfeld H: Impaired consciousness in patients with absence seizures investigated by functional MRI, EEG, and behavioural measures: a cross-sectional study. Lancet Neurol. 2016 Dec.  
Kundishora AJ, Gummadavelli A, Ma C, Liu M, McCafferty C, Schiff ND, Willie JT, Gross RE, Gerrard J, Blumenfeld H: Restoring Conscious Arousal During Focal Limbic Seizures with Deep Brain Stimulation. Cereb Cortex. 2016 Mar 3; 2016 Mar 3.  
Zhan Q, Buchanan GF, Motelow JE, Andrews J, Vitkovskiy P, Chen WC, Serout F, Gummadavelli A, Kundishora A, Furman M, Li W, Bo X, Richerson GB, Blumenfeld H: Impaired Serotonergic Brainstem Function during and after Seizures. J Neurosci. 2016 Mar 2.  
Motelow JE, Li W, Zhan Q, Mishra AM, Sachdev RN, Liu G, Gummadavelli A, Zayyad Z, Lee HS, Chu V, Andrews JP, Englot DJ, Herman P, Sanganahalli BG, Hyder F, Blumenfeld H: Decreased subcortical cholinergic arousal in focal seizures. Neuron. 2015 Feb 4.  
Bailey CJ, Sanganahalli BG, Herman P, Blumenfeld H, Gjedde A, Hyder F: Analysis of time and space invariance of BOLD responses in the rat visual system. Cereb Cortex. 2013 Jan; 2012 Jan 31.  
Blumenfeld H. (2012). Impaired consciousness in epilepsy. The Lancet Neurology, 11: 814–826.
Mishra AM, Ellens DJ, Schridde U, Motelow JE, Purcaro MJ, DeSalvo MN, Enev M, Sanganahalli BG, Hyder F, Blumenfeld H: Where fMRI and electrophysiology agree to disagree: corticothalamic and striatal activity patterns in the WAG/Rij rat. J Neurosci. 2011 Oct 19.  
Englot DJ, Yang L, Hamid H, Danielson N, Bai X, Marfeo A, Yu L, Gordon A, Purcaro MJ, Motelow JE, Agarwal R, Ellens DJ, Golomb JD, Shamy MC, Zhang H, Carlson C, Doyle W, Devinsky O, Vives K, Spencer DD, Spencer SS, Schevon C, Zaveri HP, Blumenfeld H: Impaired consciousness in temporal lobe seizures: role of cortical slow activity. Brain. 2010 Dec; 2010 Nov 16.  
Bai X, Vestal M, Berman R, Negishi M, Spann M, Vega C, Desalvo M, Novotny EJ, Constable RT, Blumenfeld H: Dynamic time course of typical childhood absence seizures: EEG, behavior, and functional magnetic resonance imaging. J Neurosci. 2010 Apr 28.  
Englot DJ, Modi B, Mishra AM, DeSalvo M, Hyder F, Blumenfeld H: Cortical deactivation induced by subcortical network dysfunction in limbic seizures. J Neurosci. 2009 Oct 14.  
Blumenfeld H, Varghese GI, Purcaro MJ, Motelow JE, Enev M, McNally KA, Levin AR, Hirsch LJ, Tikofsky R, Zubal IG, Paige AL, Spencer SS: Cortical and subcortical networks in human secondarily generalized tonic-clonic seizures. Brain. 2009 Apr; 2009 Apr 1.  
Schridde U, Khubchandani M, Motelow JE, Sanganahalli BG, Hyder F, Blumenfeld H: Negative BOLD with large increases in neuronal activity. Cereb Cortex. 2008 Aug; 2007 Dec 5.  
Blumenfeld H, Klein JP, Schridde U, Vestal M, Rice T, Khera DS, Bashyal C, Giblin K, Paul-Laughinghouse C, Wang F, Phadke A, Mission J, Agarwal RK, Englot DJ, Motelow J, Nersesyan H, Waxman SG, Levin AR: Early treatment suppresses the development of spike-wave epilepsy in a rat model. Epilepsia. 2008 Mar; 2007 Dec 6.  
Blumenfeld H, McNally KA, Vanderhill SD, Paige AL, Chung R, Davis K, Norden AD, Stokking R, Studholme C, Novotny EJ Jr, Zubal IG, Spencer SS: Positive and negative network correlations in temporal lobe epilepsy. Cereb Cortex. 2004 Aug; 2004 Apr 14.

References

External links

American neuroscientists
Yale University faculty
Harvard University alumni
1962 births
Living people
Columbia University Vagelos College of Physicians and Surgeons alumni
American physiologists
American biophysicists